Jurvand (also Romanized as Jūrvand, Jorwand, and Jowrvand) is a village in Qilab Rural District, Alvar-e Garmsiri District, Andimeshk County, Khuzestan Province, Iran. At the 2006 census, its population was 622, in 118 families.

References 

Populated places in Andimeshk County